The Purdue Fort Wayne Mastodons women's basketball team represents Purdue University Fort Wayne in Fort Wayne, Indiana. The school's team currently competes in the Horizon League.

Fort Wayne began play in women's basketball in 1976. As of the end of the 2015–16 season, they have an all-time record of 433–568. They joined Division I in 2001.

Postseason

NCAA Division II tournament results
The Mastodons made three appearances in the NCAA Division II women's basketball tournament. They had a combined record of 0–3.

References

External links